The Literal English Version of Scripture (LEV) is a translation of the Bible based on the World English Bible. Formerly known as the "Shem Qadosh Version", the title was officially changed in November 2016. It is considered a Sacred Name Bible rendering the name of God using the Hebrew characters יהוה (commonly pronounced Yahweh), and that of Jesus in Hebrew as ישוע (commonly Yeshua). It was created by a team of volunteers across the United States with additional proofing and editing assistance by individuals in Poland and Taiwan. Footnotes and appendices were written by the General Editor, J. A. Brown.

Features
The most notable feature of the Literal English Version is the transliteration of the names of people and places from the original languages. For example, the LEV gives Avraham rather than Abraham, and Yitsḥaq rather than Isaac. Along with transliterated names, it also includes many transliterated Hebrew words where no English equivalent is deemed sufficient. For example, the English word trumpet has been replaced by the Hebrew word "shofar" (שופר, literally, ram's horn) in reference to the wind instrument used to announce the fiftieth year. Other words that are transliterated include Torah instead of Law, Shaliaḥ instead of apostle, and Ruaḥ instead of spirit.

Titles such as God and Lord are also transliterated from their Hebrew counterparts such as Elohim (or El in some cases) and Adonai respectively. When used generically, such as when referring to deities of foreign peoples, the words elohim (plural) and el (singular) are utilized uncapitalized.

Translation

Whereas the World English Bible includes the biblical apocrypha, the Literal English Version does not include it in the standard text. It contains the 39 books of the Old Testament and the 27 books of the New Testament.

The Old Testament is provided in the traditional Hebrew order of Law (Torah), Prophets (Nevi'im) and Writings (Ketuvim), starting with the Book of Genesis and ending with 2 Chronicles. The Book of Daniel, which is usually placed among the Writings in Hebrew Bibles, is instead placed at the end of the Prophets.

The LEV prefers Hebraic terminology over Greek; for example, when referring to the Holy Spirit in the New Testament, Ruaḥ is used where the usual English rendering spirit is translated from the Greek πνευμα (pneuma).

The Old Testament is based primarily on the Hebrew Masoretic Text, as found in the Biblia Hebraica Stuttgartensia, with some variant readings from the Dead Sea Scrolls (DSS) and Septuagint (LXX). Footnotes indicate varying readings between the Hebrew Masoretic Text, the Greek Septuagint, the Aramaic Syriac Peshitta, the Latin Vulgate, the Dead Sea Scrolls, and the Samaritan Pentateuch.

The books of the New Testament are in a non-traditional order from the standard Christian canon. It still begins with the Gospel of Matthew and continues through the Book of Revelation. However, the LEV places the General Epistles directly after the Gospels and Acts, and places the Pauline epistles at the end, just before Revelation. The complete New Testament book order is given as follows:

 Mattithyahu [Matthew]
 Markos [Mark]
 Loukas [Luke]
 Yoḥanan [John]
 Ma'asei [Acts]
 Ya'aqov [James]
 Kepha Aleph [1 Peter]
 Kepha Bet [2 Peter]
 Yoḥanan Aleph [1 John]
 Yoḥanan Bet [2 John]
 Yoḥanan Gimel [3 John]
 Yehudah [Jude]
 Romaious [Romans]
 Kortinthious A [1 Corinthians]
 Korinthious B [2 Corinthians]
 Galatas [Galatians]
 Ephesious [Ephesians]
 Philippesious [Phillipians]
 Kolossaeis [Colossians]
 Thessalonikeon A [1 Thessalonians]
 Thessalonikeon B [2 Thessalonians]
 Timotheon A [1 Timothy]
 Timotheon B [2 Timothy]
 Titus
 Philemon
 Ivrim [Hebrews]
 Hit'galut [Revelation]

The LEV's rendering of the New Testament is based primarily on the NA28 (UBS5) Novum Testamentum Graece. Readings that vary between manuscripts or are considered spurious, such as the Pericope Adulterae (1 John 7:53-8:11) and the Longer Ending to Mark (Mark 16:9-20), are included, but set in brackets. In these instances, footnotes are included to indicate spurious or disputed readings. The Comma Johanneum is not present, as the LEV is not based on the Textus Receptus. In addition to this, the LEV New Testament also notes major textual variants between the Greek text and the Syriac Peshitta.

The LEV contains various appendices including explanatory notes, diagrams of the Tabernacle furnishings, an alphabet chart, and a weekly Torah portion reading schedule.

References

External links

2014 books
Bible translations into English
2014 in Christianity